Neville James "Tim" Coleman (29 January 1930 – 1 January 1981) was an English footballer who played in the Football League for  Crewe Alexandra and Stoke City. He holds the record for most goals scored in a match by a Stoke City player (7).

Career
Coleman was born in Prescot and joined Stoke City in 1953 as an amateur from Gorleston, Norfolk where he was completing his National Service at the local RAF base. Stoke helped Coleman secure his released from the services in January 1954 although rules meant he could not turn professional for a year. Despite initially being signed as a centre-forward to partner Frank Bowyer, manager Frank Taylor saw him as a right winger witch saw Coleman drop into the reserves to learn his new position. However a career ending injury to John Malkin in October 1956 handed Coleman his chance in the first team. He quickly became a key member of the Stoke team although an often frustrating one becoming notoriously inconstant. Whilst he lacked pace he was very difficult to dispossess.

In the 1956–57 season Coleman hit a rich vain of form in-front of goal scoring 27 goals, including a hat-trick against Middlesbrough. On 23 February 1957 Stoke played Lincoln City at the Victoria Ground and Stoke won the match 8–0 with Coleman scoring a club record seven goals. Although he failed to find the net again thereafter. Coleman scored 14 goals in 37 games in 1957–58 before Taylor decided to sell Coleman to Crewe Alexandra in February 1959 for £1,000. He later worked for Rolls-Royce before emigrating to Australia.

Career statistics

External links

References

English footballers
Stoke City F.C. players
Crewe Alexandra F.C. players
English Football League players
1930 births
1981 deaths
Gorleston F.C. players
Association football forwards